Table tennis at the 2016 South Asian Games were held in Guwahati, India from 6 – 10 February 2016.

Medallists

Medal table

References

External links
Official website

2016 South Asian Games
 
Events at the 2016 South Asian Games
2016
South Asian Games
2016 South Asian Games